Ronald A. Bussink has been a leading designer of giant Ferris wheels and similar structures for over 25 years. Bussink entered the amusement industry market in 1985 and designed, manufactured, and delivered more than 60 giant observation wheels between 1990 and 2005.

The Bussink company was previously known as Nauta Bussink prior to moving its offices from the Netherlands to Appenzell Innerrhoden, Switzerland. It was then known as Ronald Bussink Professional Rides, a registered trademark of Ronald Bussink Aktiengesellschaft, which was subsequently renamed Professional Rides Aktiengesellschaft, RoBu Privat Equity AG and then RoBu AG.
	

Wheels of Excellence
The Wheels of Excellence range included the following models:
R40
Available as either a fixed or transportable model. 15 or 30 passenger cars, each able to carry 8 people.

R50
Available as either a fixed or transportable model. 18 or 36 passenger cars, each able to carry 8 people.

R60
Available as either a fixed or transportable model. 21 or 42 passenger cars, each able to carry 8 people.

Bussink R60 wheels have operated in Australia (Brisbane), Canada (Niagara Falls), France (Paris), Malaysia (Kuala Lumpur & Malacca), UK (Belfast, Birmingham, Manchester, Sheffield), US (Atlanta, Myrtle Beach)  and elsewhere.

Roue de Paris left France in 2002 and in 2003-2004 operated in Birmingham and Manchester, England. In 2005 it visited first Geleen then Amsterdam, Netherlands, before returning to England to operate at Gateshead. In 2006 it was erected at the Suan Lum Night Bazaar in Bangkok, Thailand, and by 2008 had made its way to Antwerp, Belgium. Roue de Paris uses  of water ballast to provide a stable base. It weighs , and can be erected in 72 hours and dismantled in 60 hours by a specialist team. Transport requires seven 20-foot container lorries, ten open trailer lorries, and one closed trailer lorry. Its 42 passenger cars be loaded either 3 or 6 at a time, and each car can carry 8 people.

R80
Fixed wheel with either 6 or 8 support legs, and optional self-rotating capsules. 56 passenger cars, each able to carry 8 people.

In 2008, the Wheels of Excellence range of giant wheels was acquired by Vekoma Rides Manufacturing. Vekoma created a new division, Dutch Wheels BV, to market giant wheels as stand alone attractions. As of 2012, Wheels of Excellence variants listed by Dutch Wheels BV were the R40, R50, and R60 models.

Bussink Landmarks

Bussink Design
Bussink also founded, and is CEO of, Bussink Design. He designed the R80XL, which is manufactured and sold under licence from Bussink Design GmbH by Maurer German Wheels and Chance American Wheels. The R80XL SP is the world's tallest transportable observation wheel.

Evolution

See also
 Gold Reef City
 Top of the World (amusement ride)

References

External links
 

Amusement ride manufacturers